Ski Troop Attack is a 1960 American war film directed by Roger Corman and starring Michael Forest, Frank Wolff, Richard Sinatra, and Wally Campo. Filmgroup released the film as a double feature with Battle of Blood Island (1960).

Joe Bob Briggs called it "the best movie ever made in Deadwood, South Dakota."

Premise 
In 1944, five American soldiers lead by Lt. Factor are skiing on a reconnaissance mission behind enemy lines in Germany's Hürtgen Forest during World War II. The film starts with a fight between the Americans and Germans which has been ordered by Sgt Potter, to the annoyance of Lt Factor, who wants the patrol to be reconnaissance only.

The next morning the troops see a large German unit with tanks. Factor radios back the information and discover the Allies are under attack.

The patrol runs into some Germans and a fight ensues in which an American is killed.
The group finds a cabin, and order a young woman, Ilse to cook for them. She tries to poison the men's coffee, but Factor stops her. Then Ilse tries to shoot the soldiers, and they kill her.

Factor orders the men to make camp at a nearby cave, where they celebrate Christmas. Factor decides to blow up a railroad trestle vital to the Germans. They run into some Germans and a fight begins.

The men succeed in blowing up the rail line, but Jocko and Herman die.

Cast 
Michael Forest as Lt. Factor
Frank Wolff as Sgt. Potter
Wally Campo as Pvt. Ed Ciccola
Richard Sinatra as Pvt. Herman Grammelsbacher
Roger Corman appears in an uncredited role as a German soldier entering the cabin
James Hoffman
Chan Biggs
Tom Staley
David Markie
Skeeter Boyer
Wayne Lasher
Sheila Carol as Ilse

Production 
The script was written by Charles B. Griffith, who had worked a number of times for Corman. Griffth says he inspired in part by the Battle of the Hurtgen Forest, adding "Roger wanted the train thing. I forget which picture it was copying, but it was done in Hemingway’s A Farewell to Arms. They blew up a train and bridge in that one, and it was done all the time in Westerns. It was a pretty bad script. I remember nothing about that film but Roger skiing with the local ski club in Deadwood, North Dakota. All these teenagers who were playing Nazis, you know? [Laughs.]".

The movie was shot in Deadwood in the Black Hills over ten days. Corman did this because he could hire a crew out of Chicago for lower rates than an LA crew.

To amortize costs, Corman's brother Gene produced another film, Beast from Haunted Cave at the same time on the same location, utilising the same screenwriter and lead actors. The two films took five weeks in all the shoot, with one day off between films, and Beast was shot first. The unit was based at the Ben Franklin Hotel.

Michael Forest says he was paid $500 a week and recalls "what was taking place was tough on us physically."

Roger Corman hired ski teams from Deadwood and Lead High Schools; one played the Germans and one played the Americans. He had to shoot them on weekends and after school. He cast a German ski instructor to play the head of the German ski troop, but the instructor broke his leg two days before the shoot. Corman decided to play the role himself, having skied occasionally at college; he took a one-day skiing lesson prior to filming.

Corman recalls the shoot "as a very tough challenge. It was unbelievably cold and snowed all the time.

The film's musical score, written by cellist Fred Katz, was originally written for A Bucket of Blood. According to Mark Thomas McGee, author of Roger Corman: The Best of the Cheap Acts, each time Katz was called upon to write music for Corman, Katz sold the same score as if it were new music. The score was used in a total of seven films, including The Wasp Woman and Creature from the Haunted Sea.

Reception

Variety liked the action sequences but found the characterization clichéd and the lack of establishing shots to be a weakness. CEA Film Report found the movie to have little excitement and while the bridge explosion effect was good, it did little to help the movie.

Monthly Film Bulletin called it "a crude war film which just about gets by when it sticks to action. But the attempts at deeper meaning and characterisaton ends in cliches flying thick and fast."

References

External links 

Ski Troop Attack at TCMDB
Ski Troop Attack at BFI
Ski Troop Attack at Letterbox DVD
Roger Corman on Ski Troop Attack at Trailers from Hell

1960 films
1960 adventure films
1960s English-language films
1960s German-language films
American black-and-white films
American skiing films
Western Front of World War II films
Films directed by Roger Corman
Films produced by Roger Corman
Films with screenplays by Charles B. Griffith
Films shot in South Dakota
1960s American films